Rosebud, Alberta is a hamlet in southern Alberta, Canada within Wheatland County. Previously an incorporated municipality, Rosebud dissolved from village status on January 1, 1946, to become part of the Municipal District of Grasswold No. 248.

It sits in a sheltered valley on the Rosebud River near the edge of the Canadian Badlands. This area was called Akokiniskway by the Blackfoot people, which translates roughly to "by the river of many roses".

History 
The hamlet was founded in the 1885 by James Wishart. While following the Gleichen Trail to Montana with his family, they awoke to the river valley covered by wild roses, Alberta's official flower. Wishart then reportedly said, "Here's the promised land, we go no further."

The beauty of the valley has attracted many people throughout the years, from nature lovers to artists. Notable artists A. Y. Jackson and H. G. Glyde, members of the Group of Seven, spent a summer in 1944 painting in the area.

Over the years, farming and coal mining have been the primary industries. In 1972 the Severn Creek School was shut down as part of an Alberta wide education consolidating process and local children were bused to Standard and Drumheller. This resulted in many of the local businesses being closed and the hamlet population dropped to under a dozen people. However, the farming community of around 400 still support a seed cleaning plant.

Easter 1973, a group of young adults from Calgary brought about 40 teenagers out and camped in the then empty mercantile. This pilot event evolved into a summer camp initially funded by a grant from the Alberta government and then supported as Rosebud Camp of the Arts by Crescent Heights Baptist Church in Calgary. In 1977 a high school was founded using the old buildings of the town as classrooms and emphasizing practical, visual, music and the performing arts in its curriculum. In the 1980s, Rosebud School of the Arts began to run theatre, which eventually developed into Rosebud Theatre and the school shifted its emphasis to post-secondary education. Today Rosebud Theatre runs as a fully professional company that offers programming year round and is a tourist attraction drawing patrons from Calgary and Drumheller.

Demographics 

Economy 
Currently the primary industries within the hamlet are tourism and the arts, with the Rosebud Theatre drawing an estimated 40,000 visitors to the hamlet annually.  The theatre grew out of church outreach programme for Calgary youth.   Agriculture along with oil and gas production are significant industries in the surrounding area.

See also 
List of communities in Alberta
List of designated places in Alberta
List of former urban municipalities in Alberta
List of hamlets in Alberta

References 

Hymas, Kay: Akokiniskway, by the river of many roses, page 39. Rosebud Historical Society. 1983.
Akokiniskway, by the river of many roses, page 33. Rosebud Historical Society. 1983.

External links 

Rosebud Theatre
Rosebud Community
History Book on line (www.ourroots.ca)
Rosebud School of the Arts
Rosebud Centennial Museum

Designated places in Alberta
Hamlets in Alberta
Former villages in Alberta
Wheatland County, Alberta